Lucas Kal Schenfeld Prigioli (born 16 March 1996), known as Lucas Kal, is a Brazilian professional footballer who plays as either a central defender or a defensive midfielder for América Mineiro.

Club career

São Paulo
Born in Campinas, Lucas Kal joined São Paulo's youth setup in 2011, aged 14. He was promoted to the first team for the 2017 season, but after being only the eight-choice in the squad, he was loaned to Paraná on 20 March of that year.

Lucas Kal returned to his parent club in August 2017, and was assigned to the B-team for the year's Copa Paulista. On 20 December, still owned by São Paulo, he was presented at Guarani, where he helped the club achieve promotion from the Campeonato Paulista Série A2 as champions.

Lucas Kal made first team – and Série A – debut for Tricolor on 29 July 2018, coming on as a late substitute for fellow youth graduate Luan in a 2–0 away win over Cruzeiro on 29 July 2018. On 30 August, he moved to fellow top-tier side Vasco da Gama on loan until the following April, but was recalled on 14 December after just one match.

Again a backup option at São Paulo, Lucas Kal renewed his contract until 2022 on 5 April 2019.

América Mineiro (loan)
On 6 September, Lucas Kal moved to Série B side América Mineiro on loan until the end of the year. He scored his first professional goal on 15 October 2019, netting América's opener in a 2–0 home success over Vila Nova.

On 2 December 2019, his loan was renewed for a further year.

Nacional (loan)
On 26 July 2020, Lucas Kal left América and moved abroad, after agreeing to a one-year loan deal with Primeira Liga side C.D. Nacional. He featured regularly for his new side, but was suffered team relegation.

Return to América Mineiro
On 11 June 2021, Lucas Kal returned to América on loan until March 2022. He only started to feature regularly in September, as a defensive midfielder, and scored his first goal in the top tier on 11 September, netting his side's second in a 2–0 home win over Athletico Paranaense.

On 7 January 2022, Lucas Kal signed a permanent deal with Coelho until June 2024, with São Paulo keeping 40% of his economic rights.

Career statistics

References

External links

1996 births
Living people
Sportspeople from Campinas
Brazilian footballers
Association football defenders
Campeonato Brasileiro Série A players
Campeonato Brasileiro Série B players
São Paulo FC players
Paraná Clube players
Guarani FC players
CR Vasco da Gama players
América Futebol Clube (MG) players
Primeira Liga players
C.D. Nacional players
Brazilian expatriate footballers
Brazilian expatriate sportspeople in Portugal
Expatriate footballers in Portugal